Athol Webb (born 13 September 1935) is a former Australian rules footballer who played for Melbourne in the Victorian Football League (VFL) during the late 1950s.

A small forward, Webb was a premiership player with Melbourne in 1956 and 1957. He kicked five goals in the 1956 VFL grand final win and topped their goalkicking in their 1957 VFL premiership season with 56 goals. He represented both Victoria and his home state of Tasmania at interstate football.

Webb was captain / coach of the Norfolk Football Club from 1960 to 1961, then with East Launceston Football Club in 1962–63 in the NTFA. Webb was then enticed to Sydney as captain coach of Western Suburbs from 1964 to 1966, which included their 1965 Sydney Football League premiership.

Webb moved onto coach The Rock Yerong Creek Football Club from 1967 to 1969 in the Farrer Football League, then stayed on for six more years as a player.

External links

References

1935 births
Living people
Australian rules footballers from Tasmania
Melbourne Football Club players
East Launceston Football Club players
New Norfolk Football Club players
Scottsdale Football Club players
Tasmanian Football Hall of Fame inductees
Melbourne Football Club Premiership players
Two-time VFL/AFL Premiership players